Alf Clay (8 January 1914 – 24 January 1995) was an Australian rules footballer who played with Hawthorn, Footscray, Fitzroy and North Melbourne in the Victorian Football League (VFL).

It wasn't until Clay came to Fitzroy that he gained regular senior selection, having been a fringe player at both Hawthorn and Footscray. He kicked four goals on debut for Fitzroy in 1940, against St Kilda at Brunswick Street Oval. After making just five appearances that year, Clay played a total of 35 games in his next three seasons. In 1943 he played in a semi final but missed out on Fitzroy's premiership the following year when he crossed to North Melbourne early in the season. 
 
He was of no relation to the Clay twins, Bert and Ivor, who played for Fitzroy during the time he was at the club.

References

External links

1914 births
Australian rules footballers from Victoria (Australia)
Hawthorn Football Club players
Western Bulldogs players
Fitzroy Football Club players
North Melbourne Football Club players
Camperdown Football Club players
1995 deaths